Kienitz v. Sconnie Nation, 766 F.3d 756 (7th Cir. 2014) is a copyright case in the United States Court of Appeals for the Seventh Circuit, on the question of whether the use of a photograph used by printing and t-shirt company Sconnie Nation, LLC, was a copyright infringement or fair use. The photo in question had been taken by Michael Kienitz and was of Paul Soglin, the mayor of Madison, Wisconsin. The photo had been heavily abstracted and colorized for use on a t-shirt that said "Sorry for Partying," which referred to the Mayor's attempt to shut down an annual block party that he himself had attended in his youth. The Seventh Circuit held in 2014 that Sconnie Nation's use was fair use, applying the fair use statutory defense and relying most heavily on the lack of any effect on the market for the original photograph, rather than on its use as commentary on the mayor. While affirming the grant of summary judgment to the defendants, the opinion notes that Kienitz did not argue that his reputation for only licensing flattering uses had been harmed by the defendants' use, and stated that there was no reason that the defendants needed to use the specific photograph.

References

External links 
 Kienitz v. Sconnie Nation

Copyright case law
Fair use case law